Crainville is a village in Williamson County, Illinois, United States. The population was 1,254 at the 2010 census.

History
One of the earliest mining communities in Williamson County, Crainville is named for James M. Crain, who filed the first plat for the village.  It was initially known as "Crain City," but incorporated as the village of Crainville on June 28, 1881. A post office opened on September 26, 1888, also under the name Crainville. It discontinued operations on January 31, 1914, and  the community is now served by the post office at neighboring Carterville.

Geography
Crainville is located at  (37.748761, -89.065718).

Demographics

As of the census of 2000, there were 992 people, 425 households, and 265 families residing in the village. The racial makeup of the village was 97.78% White, 0.71% African American, 0.20% Native American, 0.20% Asian, 0.20% from other races, and 0.91% from two or more races. Hispanic or Latino of any race were 0.40% of the population.

There were 425 households, out of which 31.8% had children under the age of 18 living with them, 49.6% were married couples living together, 11.5% had a female householder with no husband present, and 37.6% were non-families. 32.5% of all households were made up of individuals, and 12.9% had someone living alone who was 65 years of age or older. The average household size was 2.33 and the average family size was 3.01.

In the village, the population was spread out, with 24.2% under the age of 18, 9.3% from 18 to 24, 29.8% from 25 to 44, 23.7% from 45 to 64, and 13.0% who were 65 years of age or older. The median age was 37 years. For every 100 females, there were 82.7 males. For every 100 females age 18 and over, there were 81.6 males.

The median income for a household in the village was $35,750, and the median income for a family was $48,021. Males had a median income of $34,219 versus $20,972 for females. The per capita income for the village was $17,911. About 6.6% of families and 8.8% of the population were below the poverty line, including 7.0% of those under age 18 and 6.3% of those age 65 or over.

Further reading
 Erwin, Milo, and Jon Musgrave. 2006. The Bloody Vendetta of Southern Illinois. Marion, Ill.: IllinoisHistory.com. 240 pages.

References

Villages in Illinois
Villages in Williamson County, Illinois
Populated places established in 1881
1881 establishments in Illinois